Ender Alkan (born January 2, 1977 in Zara, Sivas Province) is a Turkish football coach and former player who currently serves as the manager of Darıca Gençlerbirliği. He played as an attacking midfielder. Standing at 181 cm.

He has played for the Turkey under-21 team. 

He has previously played for Kartalspor, Bursaspor, Denizlispor, Diyarbakırspor, Kasımpaşa SK.

References

External links 
 Profile at Turkish Football Federation

1977 births
Living people
People from Zara, Turkey
Turkish footballers
Turkey under-21 international footballers
Kartalspor footballers
Bursaspor footballers
Denizlispor footballers
Diyarbakırspor footballers
Kasımpaşa S.K. footballers
Süper Lig players
Turkish football managers

Association football midfielders